Gwynne Blakemore Evans (31 March 1912 – 23 December 2005) was an American scholar of Elizabethan literature best known for editing the Riverside Shakespeare edition in 1974.

Biography
Evans was born on 31 March 1912 in Columbus, Ohio to Marshall B. Evans, a scholar of the German language at Ohio State University. Gwynne graduated from that university in 1934. He then earned a master's degree from the University of Cincinnati in 1936. He received his doctorate from Harvard University in 1940.  In 2000 Albright College awarded him an LL. D., honoris causa.

During World War II, Evans served in the Army Signal Corps Intelligence at Bletchley Park in England, a centre of Allied spying and decoding.

After the war, Evans became a professor of English literature, working at the University of Wisconsin, the University of Illinois, and finally Harvard, where he became Cabot Professor.

Evan's first book was The Plays and Poems of William Cartwright (1951), an edition of the obscure poet and playwright William Cartwright. He also edited Shakespearean Prompt-Books of the 17th Century (1960–80), a series of editions of rare promptbooks.

His popular edition of Shakespeare's complete works, the Riverside Shakespeare, was published in 1974 by Houghton Mifflin, and remained the standard text of Shakespeare's works in university classrooms for the next quarter century. Evans co-edited an updated version in 1997. He also edited Richard III for the New Penguin Shakespeare and Romeo and Juliet for the New Cambridge Shakespeare.

Evans's teaching style was simple and peculiarly effective.  Working through Elizabethan and Jacobean drama, he offered quiet comment, but did so on the move, walking around the front of the class in a way that strangely contributed to one's attention to him.  His courteous good nature seemed never to fail him.  His seminars and proseminars usually met in his office, located next to Child Memorial Library, which houses the special collection of the Department of English and American Language and Literature located in Widener Library of Harvard University.  The office, every surface covered with books and manuscripts, was a testament to Evans's scholarship. Indeed, even in old age Evans continued his habits as a scholar, stalking the corridors and stacks of Widener Library, steadily working.

Evans died on December 23, 2005, aged 93.

Legacy
Evans's last book was The Poems of Robert Parry, a study of the little-known poet Robert Parry.

References

Shakespearean scholars
Ohio State University alumni
Harvard University alumni
University of Cincinnati alumni
University of Wisconsin–Madison faculty
University of Illinois Urbana-Champaign faculty
Harvard University faculty
People from Columbus, Ohio
United States Army personnel
United States Army personnel of World War II
1912 births
2005 deaths